Khordeh Cheshmeh (also known as Cheshmeh Khvordeh, Khūrdeh Cheshmeh, and Khvordeh Cheshmeh) is a village in Helilan Rural District, Helilan District, Chardavol County, Ilam Province, Iran. At the 2006 census, its population was 556, in 106 families. The village is populated by Kurds.

References 

Populated places in Chardavol County
Kurdish settlements in Ilam Province